The Australian Performing Right Association Awards of 2014 (generally known as APRA Awards) are a series of related awards which include the APRA Music Awards, Art Music Awards, and Screen Music Awards. The APRA Music Awards of 2014 was the 32nd annual ceremony by the Australasian Performing Right Association (APRA) and the Australasian Mechanical Copyright Owners Society (AMCOS) to award outstanding achievements in contemporary songwriting, composing and publishing. The ceremony was held on 23 June 2014 at the Brisbane City Hall, for the first time. The host for the ceremony was Brian Nankervis, adjudicator on SBS-TV's RocKwiz.

The Art Music Awards were distributed on 26 August at the Plaza Ballroom, Melbourne. These were provided by APRA, AMCOS and Australian Music Centre (AMC) to recognise "artistic achievement and excellence within the field of Australia's art music industry." The Screen Music Awards were issued on 12 November by APRA, AMCOS and Australian Guild of Screen Composers (AGSC), which "acknowledges excellence and innovation in the genre of screen composition".

On 28 May nominations for the APRA Music Awards were announced on multiple news sources, with Birds of Tokyo and Vance Joy being the most nominated artists with four each. A total of 13 awards were presented, with Lindy Morrison honoured by the Ted Albert Award for Outstanding Services to Australian Music. Morrison is the National Welfare Coordinator of Support Act Limited – a music industry charity; previously she was on the board of Phonographic Performance Company of Australia (PPCA) for 20 years and, even earlier, a drummer for the Go-Betweens (1980–89). Sia was presented with Songwriter of the Year for the second consecutive year – the first artist to ever do so. The APRA Music Awards ceremony highlights were broadcast on the MAX network on 9 July 2014.

Presenters

At the APRA Music Awards ceremony on 23 June 2014, aside from the host, Brian Nankervis, the presenters were Amanda Brown and Robert Forster (both ex-the Go-Betweens, alongside Morrison) as well as Kate Miller-Heidke.

Performances

The APRA Music Awards ceremony showcased performances by:
 Megan Washington
 Sheppard
 Colin Hay
 Gossling
 Kate Miller-Heidke
 Melody Pool
 Kirin J. Callinan

APRA Music Awards

Blues & Roots Work of the Year

Breakthrough Songwriter of the Year

Country Work of the Year

Dance Work of the Year

International Work of the Year

Most Played Australian Work

Most Played Australia Work Overseas

Outstanding International Achievement Award

Pop Work of the Year

Rock Work of the Year

Song of the Year

Songwriter of the Year

Sia (aka Sia Furler)

Ted Albert Award for Outstanding Services to Australian Music

Lindy Morrison

Urban Work of the Year

Art Music Awards

Work of the Year – Instrumental

Work of the Year – Jazz

Work of the Year – Orchestral

Work of the Year – Vocal or Choral

Performance of the Year

Award for Excellence by an Individual

Award for Excellence by an Organisation

Award for Excellence in Music Education

Award for Excellence in a Regional Area

Award for Excellence in Experimental Music

Award for Excellence in Jazz

Distinguished Services to Australian Music

Screen Music Awards

International Achievement Award

Feature Film Score of the Year

Best Music for an Advertisement

Best Music for Children's Television

Best Music for a Documentary

Best Music for a Mini-Series or Telemovie

Best Music for a Short Film

Best Music for a Television Series or Serial

Best Original Song Composed for the Screen

Best Soundtrack Album

Best Television Theme

Most Performed Screen Composer – Australia

Most Performed Screen Composer – Overseas

References

2014 in Australian music
2014 music awards
APRA Awards